Yanina Andrea Martinez (born December 24, 1993) is a sprinter who won gold for Argentina at the 2016 Summer Paralympics in the women's 100 meters. She qualified for the 2020 Summer Paralympics, in 100m T36, and 200m T36.

She competed at the 2015 Parapan American Games winning a gold medal in T36 100m and 200m, and at the 2016 Paralympic Games winning a gold medal in T36 100m.

References

External links 
 
 

1993 births
Living people
Sportspeople from Rosario, Santa Fe
Argentine female sprinters
Paralympic athletes of Argentina
Paralympic gold medalists for Argentina
Paralympic bronze medalists for Argentina
Athletes (track and field) at the 2012 Summer Paralympics
Athletes (track and field) at the 2016 Summer Paralympics
Athletes (track and field) at the 2020 Summer Paralympics
Medalists at the 2016 Summer Paralympics
Medalists at the 2020 Summer Paralympics
Paralympic medalists in athletics (track and field)
Medalists at the 2011 Parapan American Games
Medalists at the 2015 Parapan American Games
Medalists at the 2019 Parapan American Games
Medalists at the World Para Athletics Championships
21st-century Argentine women